Sergeant  1st Class James "Todd" Graves' (born March 27, 1963) is an American sport shooter. He was born in Ruston, Louisiana. He won a bronze medal in skeet at the 2000 Summer Olympics in Sydney.

References

1963 births
Living people
Sportspeople from Ruston, Louisiana
American male sport shooters
United States Distinguished Marksman
Olympic bronze medalists for the United States in shooting
Shooters at the 1992 Summer Olympics
Shooters at the 1996 Summer Olympics
Shooters at the 2000 Summer Olympics
Shooters at the 2004 Summer Olympics
Medalists at the 2000 Summer Olympics
Pan American Games medalists in shooting
Pan American Games silver medalists for the United States
Shooters at the 2007 Pan American Games
Medalists at the 2007 Pan American Games
20th-century American people
21st-century American people